Kieran Murphy (born 1955) is an Irish retired Gaelic footballer who played for Cork Championship club Nemo Rangers and at inter-county level with the Cork senior football team.

Career

Murphy first came to sporting prominence as a dual player at schoolboy level with Coláiste Chríost Rí. He simultaneously lined out at juvenile and underage levels with the Nemo Rangers club and won several championship titles in the minor and under-21 grades. At adult level he was part of three All-Ireland Club Championship-winning teams with Nemo. Murphy first appeared on the inter-county scene with the Cork minor football team. His three-year tenure with the team yielded an All-Ireland MFC title in 1972 before later lining out with the under-21 team. Murphy joined the Cork senior football team in 1976 and was a panel member for three seasons before leaving the team. He usually lined out at corner-back.

Honours

Nemo Rangers
All-Ireland Senior Club Football Championship: 1979, 1982, 1984
Munster Senior Club Football Championship: 1974, 1975, 1978, 1981, 1983
Cork Senior Football Championship: 1974, 1975, 1977, 1978, 1981, 1983
Cork Under-21 Football Championship: 1974, 1975
Cork Minor Football Championship: 1972

Cork
Munster Under-21 Football Championship: 1974
All-Ireland Minor Football Championship: 1971
Munster Minor Football Championship: 1971, 1972
Munster Minor Hurling Championship: 1971

References

1955 births
Living people
Nemo Rangers Gaelic footballers
Cork inter-county Gaelic footballers